Hamilton Township is one of nine townships in Sullivan County, Indiana, United States. As of the 2010 census, its population was 6,869 and it contained 3,211 housing units.

Geography

Cities, towns, villages
 Sullivan (the county seat)

Unincorporated towns
 Benefiel Corner at 
 Glendora at 
 Jackson Hill at 
 Massacre at 
(This list is based on USGS data and may include former settlements.)

Adjacent townships
 Curry Township (north)
 Jackson Township (northeast)
 Cass Township (east)
 Haddon Township (south)
 Gill Township (southwest)
 Turman Township (west)
 Fairbanks Township (northwest)

Cemeteries
The township contains at least twelve cemeteries: Brodie, Center Ridge, Coffman, Free, Good Hope, Little Flock, Moore, Morgan, Palmers Prairie, Spencer, Timmons and Walls.

Major highways
  U.S. Route 41
  State Road 54

Airports and landing strips
 Sullivan County Airport

Landmarks
 Sullivan County Park

School districts
 Southwest School Corporation

Political districts
 Indiana's 8th congressional district
 State House District 45
 State Senate District 39

References
 United States Census Bureau 2008 TIGER/Line Shapefiles
 United States Board on Geographic Names (GNIS)
 IndianaMap

External links
 Indiana Township Association
 United Township Association of Indiana

Townships in Sullivan County, Indiana
Terre Haute metropolitan area
Townships in Indiana